Koh Traoré (born August 29, 1989 in Ouagadougou) is a Burkinabé-born Ivory Coast football striker who plays for EGS Gafsa in the Tunisian Ligue Professionnelle 1.

Club career
Traoré played for Etoile Filante in the Burkinabé Premier League. for a reported 30,000 Euros fee he moved to the Algerian side ES Setif and later to WA Tlemcen. He mutually agreed to leave WA Tlemcen and joined the Malaysian side Sabah FA for the 2013 Malaysia Premier League.

He scored his first hat-trick when Sabah FA drew 3–3 while on the match against PDRM FA and went on to score three more hat-tricks that season.

Traore finished the 2013 season at Sabah FA with 18 League Goals, which set a new record at the club.

After a half-season with Rail Club du Kadiogo, Traore signed for Tunisian side EGS Gafsa in July 2014.

References

External links
 
 

Living people
1989 births
Algerian Ligue Professionnelle 1 players
Expatriate footballers in Algeria
Ivorian footballers
Sportspeople from Ouagadougou
ES Sétif players
Étoile Filante de Ouagadougou players
WA Tlemcen players
Sabah F.C. (Malaysia) players
EGS Gafsa players
Expatriate footballers in Malaysia
Expatriate footballers in Tunisia
Association football forwards
21st-century Burkinabé people